Monascus pallens is a fungal species in the Monascaceae family. It was found during a survey done on water and sediment of the Shatt al-Arab river in Basra, Iraq. The research was done by Dr. Basil A. Abbas under supervision of SK. Abdullah in 1995.

References

Eurotiales